Aaron Chatman (born 11 May 1987) is an Australian right arm amputee Paralympic athlete competing in class T47 men's high jump, long jump and 100 m. He has won silver and bronze medals at the Summer Paralympics.

Athletics
At the 2006 IPC Athletics World Championships in Assen, he won a silver medal in the men's high jump F44/46.  In 2007, he broke the world high jump record F44/46 with a jump of 2.05m at the 2007 ACT Championships.

He competed in the 2008 Summer Paralympics in Beijing, China. There he won a silver medal in the men's high jump F44/46 event where he cleared 2.02m and a bronze medal in the men's 4 × 100 m relay T42–46 event.  He was coached by Irina Dvoskina. He nearly missed competing due to chicken pox keeping him isolated in Hong Kong prior to the Games.

He returned to competition at the 2016 Rio Paralympics where he won the bronze medal in the Men's High Jump T45-47 with a jump of 1.99m.

At the 2017 World Para Athletics Championships in London, England,  he won a silver medal in the Men's High Jump T47 with a jump of  1.94 m and ewas coached by Gary Bourne.
 Chatman finished fifth in the Men's High Jump T47 at the  2017 World Para Athletics Championships in  Dubai with a jump of 1.87m.

He was an Australian Institute of Sport scholarship holder coached by Irina Dvoskina. He announced his retirement in November 2020 after experiencing complications with a chronic injury.

References

External links
 
 
 Aaron Chatmann at Athletics Australia
 Aaron Chatman at Australian Athletics Historical Results (archive)

Paralympic athletes of Australia
Athletes (track and field) at the 2008 Summer Paralympics
Athletes (track and field) at the 2016 Summer Paralympics
Paralympic silver medalists for Australia
Paralympic bronze medalists for Australia
Amputee category Paralympic competitors
Medalists at the 2008 Summer Paralympics
Medalists at the 2016 Summer Paralympics
1987 births
Living people
Australian Institute of Sport Paralympic track and field athletes
World record holders in Paralympic athletics
Paralympic medalists in athletics (track and field)
Australian male high jumpers